Glen Hansard (born 21 April 1970) is an Irish singer-songwriter, musician and actor. Since 1990, he has been the frontman of the Irish rock band The Frames, with whom he has released six studio albums, four of which have charted in the top ten of the Irish Album Charts. In the 2000s, he was one half of folk rock duo The Swell Season before releasing his debut solo album, Rhythm and Repose, in 2012. His 2015 second album Didn't He Ramble was nominated for the Grammy Award for Best Folk Album.

Primarily a musician, he has also acted and written music for film; he appeared in the BAFTA-winning film The Commitments (1991) and, notably, starred in the Irish music drama Once (2007) which earned him a number of major awards, including the Academy Award for Best Original Song for "Falling Slowly" with co-writer and co-star Markéta Irglová. The film was later adapted into an award-winning-musical theatre production.

Career
Hansard quit school at age 13 to begin busking on local Dublin streets. He formed his own band The Frames in 1990, and the group have been gigging regularly in Ireland since. Hansard came to international attention as guitar player Outspan Foster in the 1991 Alan Parker film The Commitments. He has often stated that he regretted taking the role because he felt it distracted him from his music career. In 2003, he presented the television programme Other Voices: Songs from a Room, which showcased Irish music talent on RTÉ.

On 22 April 2006, he released his first album without The Frames, The Swell Season, on Overcoat Recordings in collaboration with Czech singer and multi-instrumentalist Markéta Irglová, Marja Tuhkanen from Finland on violin and viola, and Bertrand Galen from France on cello.  Hansard also spent part of 2006 in front of the cameras for the music-infused Irish film Once, in which Hansard plays a Dublin busker, and Irglová an immigrant street vendor. The film had its United States premiere at the Sundance Film Festival in 2007 and received the Festival's World Cinema Audience Award. During the promotional tour, he and Irglová began dating. Said Hansard about his relationship with Irglova: "I had been falling in love with her for a long time, but I kept telling myself she's just a kid".

Hansard had recorded a version of Bob Dylan's "You Ain't Goin' Nowhere" for the film I'm Not There in 2007. In 2009, Hansard said that he and Irglova were no longer romantically linked, and that they are now "good friends".

Aside from his projects with The Frames and Irglová, Hansard also took part as a member of the band on the 2006 Oxfam charity album, The Cake Sale. Hansard has recorded several cover songs, both alone and with band member Colm Mac Con Iomaire, for the Today FM discs Even Better than the Real Thing. Songs that he has recorded include Justin Timberlake's "Cry Me a River" on Even Better than the Real Thing Vol. 1 and Britney Spears' "Everytime" on Vol. 2.

He voiced a role on an episode ("In the Name of the Grandfather") on The Simpsons as an Irish busker. A new album of original songs recorded as The Swell Season with Markéta Irglová and entitled Strict Joy was released on 27 October 2009 on the ANTI- record label.

In the summer of 2011, he joined Eddie Vedder on his American solo tour in support of Vedder's solo album, Ukulele Songs. He played a solo concert at the opening of the Metropolitan Museum of Art's Guitar Heroes exhibit in New York City in May 2011 and on Cape Cod at the Cape Cinema on 17 June.

In September 2011, he played at Pearl Jam's 20th Anniversary Festival PJ20 at the Alpine Valley Theatre outside of East Troy, Wisconsin. Hansard plays several guitars, including a very recognisable battered Takamine NP15 acoustic guitar (even sporting a large hole), which he calls "The Horse".

In a November 2011 interview in The Huffington Post with Irglova, it was revealed that Hansard was preparing a solo album and that there was a very possible third release from The Swell Season. This solo album was later revealed to be titled Rhythm and Repose.

American Songwriter included Hansard's "Love Don't Leave Me Waiting" on its The Muse July Sampler. Another song of his featured in a film soundtrack is This Gift, which appears in The Odd Life of Timothy Green.

Hansard sang the song "Take the Heartland" on the soundtrack for the 2012 film The Hunger Games. Another song he wrote, "Come Away to the Water", is featured on the soundtrack, but is covered by Maroon 5 and Rozzi Crane. Hansard can be found singing "Come Away to the Water" on the deluxe edition of his first solo album Rhythm and Repose. He guest-starred in an episode of the TV series, Parenthood, playing himself. In the episode, "Trouble in Candyland", he performed "High Hope", a single from his solo debut album Rhythm and Repose. In 2015, Hansard and Lisa Hannigan recorded a song, "On Love", for the soundtrack for the 2014 film Kahlil Gibran's The Prophet. Hansard sang Coyote at the Joni Mitchell 75th birthday concert Joni 75: A Birthday Celebration in Los Angeles in December 2018.

Influences
Hansard has remarked about his musical influences: "In my house, when I was a kid, there was the holy trinity, which was Leonard Cohen, Van Morrison, and Bob Dylan with Bob sitting centre." Hansard and The Frames toured as the support act for Bob Dylan in Australia and New Zealand in August 2007 and Hansard often performs Van Morrison's songs in concert. Two such songs include "Into the Mystic", and "And the Healing Has Begun" which were included on the collector's edition of the soundtrack for the film Once.

Hansard is a devotee of Krishna and performed for the 80th birthday of Swami Prabhupada in London, staying at a manor donated to the Hare Krishna movement by The Beatles' George Harrison, who was a Hare Krishna devotee. In July 2013, he sang with Bruce Springsteen at Nowlan Park, Kilkenny, Ireland. In July 2015, he performed "Raglan Road" with Ed Sheeran in Croke Park, Dublin.

Other
In 2008, Hansard took a four-week filmmaking workshop at the New York Film Academy.

In 2016, Hansard was a prominent member of the Home Sweet Home Group, a coalition of activists and homeless. The group broke into Apollo House in Dublin and illegally occupied it. They eventually had to vacate the premises due to trespassing.

Awards and nominations

Discography

Solo

Albums

Singles and EPs
 This Gift (2012) (promo)
 High Hope (2012) (promo)
 Bird of Sorrow (2012) (promo)
 Love Don't Leave Me Waiting (2012) (promo)
 Drive All Night EP (November 2013)
 It Was Triumph We Once Proposed...Songs of Jason Molina EP (17 March 2015)
 Winning Streak (30 June 2015)
 Lowly Deserter (November 2015) – (Sky Stone & Records)
 A Season on the Line EP (February 2016)
Cold Comfort (June 2020)

The Frames

 Another Love Song (1991)
 Fitzcarraldo (1995)
 Dance the Devil (1999)
 For the Birds (2001)
 Breadcrumb Trail (2002)
 Burn the Maps (2004)
 The Cost (2006)
 Longitude (2015)

The Swell Season

 The Swell Season (2006)
 Once: Music from the Motion Picture (2007)
 Strict Joy (2009)

Films and television
 The Commitments (1991)
 Once (2007)
 Austin City Limits (2008)
 The Simpsons (2009 episode: "In the Name of the Grandfather") 
 Ballymun Lullaby (2011; documentary)
 The Swell Season (2011) 
 Play (2011)
 Parenthood (2010 TV series) (2012 episode: "Trouble in Candyland")
 In the Deep Shade (2013 documentary, with the Irish band The Frames)
 The Last Man on Earth (TV series) (2016 episode "Falling Slowly")
 Cyrano (2021, Guard #1)

See also
 The Stars Are Underground – 24-minute film documenting the underground music scene in Dublin (1996)

References

External links

 Official Website
 
 Profile, theswellseason.com
 Lyrics, IrishMusicCentral.com 
 "Excreting Songs" (Hansard interview)
 It's Just A Band (2005).

1970 births
Ballymun
20th-century Irish male singers
21st-century Irish male singers
Living people
Irish buskers
Irish male guitarists
Irish male singer-songwriters
Irish baritones
Laurence Olivier Award winners
Musicians from Dublin (city)
New York Film Academy alumni
Other Voices presenters
Rhythm guitarists
Best Original Song Academy Award-winning songwriters
Drama Desk Award winners
The Swell Season members
The Frames members
Anti- (record label) artists